Protohydridae is a family of cnidarians belonging to the order Anthoathecata.

Genera:
 Protohydra Greeff, 1869
 Sympagohydra Piraino, Bluhm, Gradinger & Boero, 2008

References

 
Aplanulata
Cnidarian families